Terra Incognita is the debut album released by French heavy metal band Gojira. It was recorded and mixed by Stephan Kraemer. According to a text on the album inlay, the title (Latin for "unknown land") refers to the area inside of each man, where, according to Hindu legend, Brahma hid the divinity that he had taken from humanity for the punishment of its abuse. In 2009, the album was re-released in a limited edition digipack including three bonus tracks.  The 2009 issues of the album were for a limited time only and was eventually reissued once again 7 years later on 10 October 2016. Prior to these two reissues and the following years after the 2009 reissue, copies of the album were getting hard to find and were often selling at higher prices on auction sites and sought after by fans following long periods of time being out of print.

Writing and composition 
Terra Incognita was written at the time vocalist Joe Duplantier had deliberately moved away from society to live two years in a cabin that he had built. He lived in this cabin in a forest with his girlfriend without electricity and without income. The reference of this experience is in the music video of "Love".

The song "04" was made by Joe and Mario as a birthday present for their mother on her 50th birthday and was never intended to be released at all. The phone call at the beginning of the song is the brothers' uncle who left a voice-mail greeting his sister.

In 2001, Joe Duplantier described that "This [album] cover sums up the whole album, that is to say a reflection, then an exploration of the soul, which remains an unknown land". The man posing on the album cover is guitarist Christian Andreu.

Track listing 

Hidden track
The song "In the Forest" contains a hidden instrumental song called "Terra Inc." The main piece of the track ends at 5:30 and the hidden song starts at 9:00, giving the song a period of silence lasting 3:30. The song contains complex layers of ambient guitar sounds with various echo and reverb effects. This song ends promptly at 12:11 and closes the album. On the "Reissue version", the song "In the Forest" ends and starts the instrumental hidden song after only 10 seconds of silence. The band employed a similar tactic with the closing and title track of their 2008 album The Way of All Flesh.

Personnel 
 Joe Duplantier – vocals, rhythm guitar
 Christian Andreu – lead guitar
 Jean-Michel Labadie – bass
 Mario Duplantier – drums

References 

2001 debut albums
Gojira (band) albums